Ariel Sharon Park is an environmental park along the lines of Ayalon river, in the area between Ben Gurion Airport and Highway 20 (Ayalon Highway). The area is 8.5 square kilometers big, and was intended to be the "green lung" of the southern part of Gush Dan metropolin. The park was established on the former Hiriya waste dump located southeast of Tel Aviv, Israel, the Shalem farm, Mikveh Israel village and the Menachem Begin Park. After accumulating 25 million tons of waste, the Hiriya facility was shut down in August 1998. Hiriya is visible on approach into Ben Gurion International Airport as a flat-topped hill. Three recycling facilities have been established at the foot of the mountain: a waste separation center, a green waste facility that produces mulch and a building materials recycling plant. The waste dump and its surrounding area have been renovated into a large park that is still under construction.

History
The Hiriya landfill was located on the lands of the Palestinian village of al-Khayriyya, from which the name Hiriya is derived. The village, formerly called Ibn Ibraq, preserving the name of the ancient biblical site Beneberak, was renamed al-Khayriyya in 1924. In the weeks prior to the outbreak of the 1948 Arab-Israeli War, its residents fled the village before advancing Haganah forces.

According to Rachelle Gershovitz of the Israel Venture Capital Journal, the British authorities designated the area as Crown Land and plans were drawn up to use it as a draining plain to solve the annual flooding problem during the British Mandate.

Earmarked as a dump in 1952, the site grew to be more than half a mile long and over 87 yards (80 meters) above sea level. The volume of waste was estimated at 16 million cubic meters. Calls to shut down the site mounted in the wake of the growing public awareness of environmental pollution, underground water contamination and the spread of noxious gases. Thousands of sea gulls and other birds attracted by the decomposing garbage created a hazard for commercial airliners taking off and landing at nearby Ben Gurion Airport.

In 1988, Hiriya ceased functioning as a waste landfill.

In 2004, an international competition was held calling for ideas on how to rehabilitate the mountain of garbage, turn it into a positive landmark and keep it from collapsing into the Ayalon riverbed.

Ariel Sharon Park
Plans were subsequently drawn up to remediate the site and use the mountain and surrounding land as the centerpiece of Ariel Sharon Park . A  area was demarcated for the park during the term of the then Israeli prime minister Ariel Sharon, who was an avid supporter of the project. The park was later named for Sharon. The planner is German landscape architect and urban planner Peter Latz. Latz has invented a technique to protect future flowers and fruits from contaminants: The landscape is being covered with a "bioplastic" layer that blocks methane, topped with layers of gravel and a meter of clean soil.

As of 2011, the park was under construction. When complete, it will be three times the size of New York's Central Park, and will introduce many new ecological technologies. A 50,000-seat amphitheater will also be built there.

Jurisdiction
Hiriya is not under the jurisdiction of any municipality. The site is managed by the Dan Region Association of Towns Sanitation and Solid Waste Disposal board.

Remaining waste processing assets
As of 2007, Hiriya was housing the largest waste transfer station in Israel. Doron Saphir was Hiriya's chairman. Three recycling plants operated at the foot of the mound, grinding building waste into gravel and dry organic matter into mulch, and a patented mechanical biological treatment demonstration facility where municipal solid waste was sorted utilising the properties of water. The facility was a form of materials recovery facility including upflow anaerobic sludge blanket digesters for the provision of biogas, which was in turn used to generate renewable energy utilising gas engines.

In 2007 garden waste was sorted, and tree trunks were sent to the Hiriya carpentry shop to be recycled into wooden furniture such as benches and garden accessories for use in the park. Sixty gas wells have been drilled at the site to collect the methane gas trapped in the landfill. The plant generated all the electricity required by the Hiriya site and sold the excess to the Israel Electric Corporation.

As described in a 2004 article, a recycling facility operated by the Israeli company ArrowEcology has introduced a new technology known as ArrowBio that separates recyclable materials using water technology. Eighty percent of the waste that enters the system is reused, while only 20 percent ends up in the landfill.

Film
In 2011, a short film about the transformation of the site, The Hiriya Project: A Mountain of Change, won first prize in the Clean Development Mechanism Changing Lives Photo and Video Contest sponsored by the United Nations Framework Convention on Climate Change (UNFCCC) in Durban.

See also
List of solid waste treatment technologies
Mechanical biological treatment
Constructed wetland
Ramat Hovav

References

External links
Hiriya website
Removing Hiriya Garbage Dump, a Test Case

Parks in Israel
Waste processing sites
Ariel Sharon